Danish Mujtaba (born 20 December 1988 in Allahabad) is an Indian professional field hockey player. He made his debut for the national team in 2009. He represented India during the 2012 Summer Olympics in London and the 2016 Olympics in Rio.

He comes from a family of hockey players, including his grandfather Idris Ahmed, his uncle Atif Idris, his father Ghulam Mujtaba and his elder brother Hamza Mujtaba who have played for India.  He first represented India at junior level, at the 2009 Junior World Cup.  He played for the senior team at the 2010 World Cup and later went on to become Captain of national team in 2013.

He is an alumnus of the Guru Gobind Singh Sports College, Lucknow and Jamia Millia Islamia.

Career 
Mujtaba made his way to the national team after doing well at the junior level. He is a product of Delhi based Air India-SAI Hockey Academy which he joined in 2004 and has attended a training program at the Australian Institute of Sport. He is sports officer in Uttar Pradesh Power Corporation Limited (UPPCL) since January 2011.

Personal life 
Mujtaba  married Nayala of Allahabad in November 2016. Nayala completed M.Tech from SHIATS. Her father Mohammad Gurfan is teacher by profession.

References

External links
 Danish Mujtaba at Hockey India

Living people
1988 births
Asian Games medalists in field hockey
World Series Hockey players
Field hockey players at the 2012 Summer Olympics
Field hockey players at the 2016 Summer Olympics
Olympic field hockey players of India
Field hockey players at the 2010 Asian Games
Field hockey players at the 2014 Asian Games
Field hockey players from Uttar Pradesh
Indian male field hockey players
Asian Games gold medalists for India
Asian Games bronze medalists for India
Commonwealth Games silver medallists for India
Commonwealth Games medallists in field hockey
Medalists at the 2010 Asian Games
Medalists at the 2014 Asian Games
Guru Gobind Singh Sports College, Lucknow alumni
Jamia Millia Islamia alumni
Hockey India League players
Delhi Waveriders players
Field hockey players at the 2010 Commonwealth Games
Field hockey players at the 2014 Commonwealth Games
2010 Men's Hockey World Cup players
Medallists at the 2010 Commonwealth Games
Medallists at the 2014 Commonwealth Games